Arandora Fort was built by the Portuguese in Narangoda, Kurunegala, and was captured by Dutch in 1665.

The fort served as a base camp for the Portuguese and it served as a fortification for the Dutch, especially against the forces of the Kandyan king Rajasinghe II. In October 1670 the Kandyan forces attacked and captured the fort taking the Dutch garrison, who were stationed there at the time of the battle, prisoners. In order to facilitate the release of the prisoners the Dutch closed the ports at Batticaloa, Kottiar and Kalpitiya.

There are no visible remains of the fort.

References 

 

Dutch forts in Sri Lanka
Forts in North Western Province, Sri Lanka
Buildings and structures in Kurunegala District
Portuguese forts in Sri Lanka